Cranbrook is a city in southeast British Columbia, Canada, located on the west side of the Kootenay River at its confluence with the St. Mary's River. It is the largest urban centre in the region known as the East Kootenay. As of 2016, Cranbrook's population is 20,499 with a census agglomeration population of 27,040. It is the location of the headquarters of the Regional District of East Kootenay and also the location of the regional headquarters of various provincial ministries and agencies, notably the Rocky Mountain Forest District.

According to the Cranbrook Daily Townsman, dated 9 February 2022, Cranbrook has a population of 20,499. This is also indicated in the latest census data on the Government of Canada website.

Cranbrook is home to the Canadian Museum of Rail Travel which presents static exhibits of passenger rail cars built in the 1920s for the CPR and in the 1900s for the Spokane International Railway.

History 

Originally inhabited by Ktunaxa peoples, the land that Cranbrook now occupies was bought by European settlers, notably Colonel James Baker who named his newly acquired land Cranbrook after his home in Cranbrook, Kent, England. In 1890, the Kootenay Indian Residential School, also called St. Eugene's, opened in Cranbrook, and operated until 1975.

In 1898, Baker had successfully convinced Canadian Pacific Railway to establish their Crowsnest Pass line through Cranbrook rather than nearby Gold Rush Boom Town Fort Steele. With that accomplishment Cranbrook became the major centre of the region, while Fort Steele declined; however, the latter is today a preserved heritage town.

On November 1, 1905, Cranbrook was incorporated as a city.

Some of the major industries include mining and forestry services, trades, and health care.

Geography 
While much of the city is relatively flat, Cranbrook is surrounded by many rising hills where many residential homes are located. Cranbrook faces the Purcell Mountains to the west and the Rocky Mountains to the north and east. There are many lakes in close proximity to Cranbrook. Some of these lakes include Jim Smith Lake, Wasa Lake, Lazy Lake, Moyie Lake, Monroe Lake, Norbury Lake and Elizabeth Lake. Many of these lakes contain opportunities for boating, fishing and camping. There are public recreational beaches and provincial campgrounds.

Climate 
Cranbrook features a humid continental climate (Dfb) under the Köppen climate classification. Environment and Climate Change Canada reports Cranbrook as having the most sunshine hours of any BC city at approximately 2190.5 hours annually. It is a fairly dry city throughout the year, and when precipitation does fall a good percentage of it will be in the form of snow. Environment and Climate Change Canada also states that the city experiences some of the lightest wind speeds year-round, has few foggy days, and has among the highest average barometric pressure of any city in Canada. Frost-free days average 110 days, typically occurring between May 26 to September 14. Overall, its climate is extremely similar to that of Kelowna, in the nearby Okanagan Valley to the west - especially in regard to precipitation patterns and total monthly accumulation. However, Kelowna is significantly warmer throughout all seasons.

Demographics 

Ethnicity

Religion 
According to the 2021 census, religious groups in Cranbrook included:
Irreligion (11,190 persons or 56.4%)
Christianity (8,060 persons or 40.6%)
Sikhism (155 persons or 0.8%)
Hinduism (120 persons or 0.6%)
Buddhism (85 persons or 0.4%)
Islam (45 persons or 0.2%)
Indigenous Spirituality (25 persons or 0.1%)
Judaism (15 persons or 0.1%)

Education

Schools 
Public schools are run by School District 5 Southeast Kootenay, consisting of seven elementary schools and two middle schools that feed into the city's only high school: Mount Baker Secondary School, home to approximately 1,000 students and 90 staff members. Mount Baker is the largest high school in school district five. Prior to 2004, the middle schools were referred to as junior high schools housing grades 8-10 rather than the current 7–9. However, due to declining enrollment, the school district adopted the new system. There is also a local home-school network.

The following 13 schools are located in Cranbrook.
 Aqamnik Elementary School (First Nations school located in St. Mary's Band)
 Amy Woodland Elementary
 Gordon Terrace Elementary
 Highlands Elementary School
 Kootenay Christian Academy
 Kootenay Orchards Elementary School
 Laurie Middle School
 Mount Baker Secondary School
 Parkland Middle School
 Pinewood Elementary School
 St. Mary's Catholic Independent School (private school)
 Steeples Elementary School
 T M Roberts Elementary School

Post-secondary education 
Cranbrook is home to the main campus of the College of the Rockies, which has over 2,500 full and part-time students from over 21 countries.

Transportation 
Cranbrook is at the junction of major highways 3 and 93/95, and due to its close proximity to the borders of Alberta and the United States, it is an important transportation hub. Cranbrook has a major Canadian Pacific Railway yard, which serves as a key gateway for trains arriving from and departing to the United States.

The McPhee Bridge also known as the St. Mary's Bridge rises high above the St. Mary River and is near the Cranbrook/Canadian Rockies International Airport and the Shadow Mountain Golf Community. It supports the thousands of people who travel between Kimberley and Cranbrook on highway 95A.

The airport is served by Air Canada Jazz to Vancouver, Pacific Coastal Airlines to Victoria and Kelowna, and WestJet Link to Vancouver and Calgary. On February 11, 1978, Pacific Western Airlines Flight 314, a Boeing 737-200, nearly impacted a snowplow on the runway at the airport in Cranbrook, then lost control and crashed, killing 42 of the 49 people on board.

Cranbrook has a public transit system operated by BC Transit, which runs buses on eight different lines.

Health care
Cranbrook has the largest hospital in the region, the East Kootenay Regional Hospital.

Sports and recreation 

Western Financial Place (formerly called the RecPlex) is a pool and hockey arena in Cranbrook that opened in 2000, and was formerly the home to the Kootenay Ice until relocating to Winnipeg, Manitoba, in 2019. Following their departure, the recreational centre became home to the Cranbrook Bucks who play in the BCHL. A paved, two-lane  trail exists between Cranbrook and Kimberley, BC. This trail constitutes a section of the Trans-Canada Trail and is known as the Rails to Trails. Canadian Pacific Railway donated the rail right-of-way and the teardown of the railway began by CP Rail in 2009. In addition to this trail, there are 2000 acres of wilderness to explore in the community forest.

Media 
Newspapers
 Cranbrook Daily Townsman - Daily paper

Radio stations
 101.3 FM - CBRR-FM, CBC Radio One (repeats CBTK-FM, Kelowna)
 102.9 FM - CHDR-FM, 102.9 REWIND RADIO
 104.7 FM - CHBZ-FM, B-104, Country
 107.5 FM - CFSM-FM, 107.5 2day FM, Adult Contemporary

Television
 Channel 5: (Air) Channel 4: (Cable) CFCN-TV-9, CTV (analogue repeater of CFCN-DT Calgary)
 Shaw TV (community cable channel)

Notable people 
The following notable people come from or were born in Cranbrook:

 Ray Allison, retired NHL player
 Greg Andrusak, retired NHL player
 Bowen Byram, NHL player
 Brent Carver, actor
 Glen Cochrane, retired NHL player
 Tanya Fir, Member of the Alberta Leglislature, 2019-
 James Heilman, doctor
 Jim Hiller, retired NHL player
 Dryden Hunt, NHL player
 Juggernaut, retired professional wrestler
 Jon Klemm, retired NHL player
 Lillix, former pop rock band
 Bernie Lukowich, retired NHL player
 Brad Lukowich, retired NHL player
 Donald C. MacDonald, politician
 Jason Marshall, retired NHL player
 Bob McAneeley, former WHA player
 Ted McAneeley, retired NHL and WHA player
 Evah McKowan, novelist
 Bob Murdoch and Don Murdoch, retired NHL players
 Riley Nelson, retired ECHL player and captain for the Colorado Eagles
 Rob Niedermayer, retired NHL player
 Scott Niedermayer, retired NHL player
 Kate Pullinger, author
 Tom Renney, former NHL and Olympic ice hockey coach
 Ben Rutledge, Olympic gold medal rower
 Joel Savage, retired NHL player
 Terry Segarty, businessman and BC Minister of Labour
 Corey Spring, retired NHL player
 Frank Spring, retired NHL player
 Steve Yzerman, retired NHL player
 Tom Shypitka, three time Provincial Curling Champion (1979, 1991, 2010)

Sister cities 
Cranbrook is twinned with
 Coeur d'Alene, Idaho (United States)

References

External links 

 
Cities in British Columbia